The Pittsburgh Vengeance are a non-sanctioned junior ice hockey team and are members of the Great Lakes Conference in the United States Premier Hockey League's Premier Division. The team plays at the Alpha Ice Complex in Harmar Township, Pennsylvania, a township outside of Pittsburgh. In addition to the junior team, the organization also fields teams at the former Tier III Junior B/C levels and various youth levels of play. From 1997 until 2012, the team was known as the Pittsburgh Jr. Penguins.

History
The Pittsburgh Jr. Penguins entered the Metro Junior A Hockey League in 1997. After a good inaugural season including a playoff run, under head coach John Vivian, the league merged with the Ontario Provincial Junior A Hockey League. The Penguins opted not to join and entered the more local Empire Junior B Hockey League (EmJHL). In 2006, the Penguins fielded a second Junior B team in the Continental Hockey Association's Premier Junior B Division.  In 2007, the Penguins created a third and fourth entry for the CHA's Major and Minor Junior C leagues. In 2009 the organization added a Tier III Junior A team that began play in Fall 2009 in the Central States Hockey League (CSHL). In 2010, the CSHL became the North American 3 Hockey League (NA3HL) after the Tier II North American Hockey League took control of the CSHL. In 2012, the team was rebranded the Three Rivers Vengeance for one season before it changed to the Pittsburgh Vengeance in 2013. The Vengeance left the NA3HL in 2018 for the Premier Division of the United States Premier Hockey League.

The Jr. Penguins fielded Junior B teams in CHA Premier (later called Eastern States Hockey League and the Empire Junior B Hockey League, and a Junior C team in the CHA Selects. In 2006, USA Hockey dropped the Junior C designation and those teams became Tier III Junior B. In 2011, USA Hockey dropped both the Junior A and B designations and called all the leagues as just Tier III, but since many organizations still fielded teams in the former lower leagues most were still referred to as their former designation.

Season-by-season records
Flagship team's statistics.

References

External links
Pittsburgh Vengeance (Official website)

Ice hockey teams in Pennsylvania
Pittsburgh Penguins minor league affiliates
1997 establishments in Pennsylvania
Ice hockey clubs established in 1997
Sports in Pittsburgh
Allegheny County, Pennsylvania